Harry May (15 October 1928 — 9 July 2007) was an English professional footballer who played as a full back. He made over 200 appearances in the Football League.

Career
May began his career with Scottish junior side Thorniewood United before signing for Cardiff City in 1948. Although he played as a full back, he made his professional debut as a forward during an injury crisis in a 1–0 defeat to Leicester City. However, it proved to be his only league appearance for the club and he was allowed to join Swindon Town in 1950.

At Swindon, he was able to establish himself in the first team and made 78 league appearances during a two-year spell before moving to Barnsley. May was ever present for Barnsley as they won the Third Division North title during the 1954–55 season, playing in every league match. However, a dispute over wages eventually led him to leave the club in 1955, finishing his professional career with Southend United.

References

1928 births
2007 deaths
Scottish footballers
Thorniewood United F.C. players
Cardiff City F.C. players
Swindon Town F.C. players
Barnsley F.C. players
Southend United F.C. players
English Football League players
Association football fullbacks